Alder Brook flows into the Middle Branch Grass River near Degrasse, New York.

References 

Rivers of St. Lawrence County, New York